The Ministry of Economy and Finance ( Ministère de l’Economie et des Finances) is the government ministry responsible for governing and managing the economy and the financial activity of Benin.

The current Minister of Economy and Finance is Romuald Wadagni.

Ministers responsible for finance

Sourou-Migan Apithy, Nov 1960 - Dec 1960
Alexandre Adandé, December 1960 - September 1963
Bertin Borna, September 1963 - October 1963 
Sourou-Migan Apithy, October 1963 - January 1964 
François Akplogan, January 1964 - 1965 
Antoine Boya, November 1965 - December 1965
Nicéphore Soglo, December 1965 - December 1966
Pascal Chabi Kao, December 1967 - 1968
Stanislas Yedomon Kpognon, 1968 - December 1969
Maurice Kouandété, December 1969 - May 1970
Pascal Chabi Kao, May 1970 - October 1972 
Thomas Lahami, October 1972 - April 1973 
Janvier Codjo Assogba, April 1973 - October 1974
Isidore Amoussou, October 1974 - August 1984
Hospice Antonio, August 1984 - February 1987
Barnabé Bidouzo, February 1987 - 1988
Didier Dassi, August 1988 - 1990
Idelphonse Lemon, 1990-1991
Paul Dossou, 1991-1996 
Moïse Mensah, 1996-1998 
Abdoulaye Bio-Tchané, 1998-2002
Grégoire Laourou, 2002-2005
Cosme Sèhlin, 2005-2006
Pascal Koupaki, 2006-2007
Soulé Mana Lawani, 2007-2009
Idriss L. Daouda, 2009-2011
Adidjatou Mathys, 2011-2012
Jonas A. Gbian, 2012-2014
Komi Koutché, 2014-2016
Romuald Wadagni, 2016-

See also
 Government of Benin
 Economy of Benin

References

External links
 Ministry of Economy and Finance
 Ministry of Economy and Finance, information page at Gouvernement du Benin

Economy of Benin
Benin
Benin
Government of Benin